Club Deportivo Espíritu Santo  is a Salvadoran professional football club based at Isla el Jobal, Usulután Department, El Salvador.

The club currently plays in the Primera División Aficionado de Fútbol Salvadoreño and is known as Los Isleños.

In 2012, the club won promotion to the second division for the first team in the club history after winning their championship playoff against San sebastion 2–0, the goals were scored by Oscar Muñoz (60th min) and Ramon Diaz (92 min).

References

Football clubs in El Salvador
Association football clubs established in 2006
2006 establishments in El Salvador